Robert Brown Aderholt (born July 22, 1965) is an American politician and attorney serving as the U.S. representative for  since 1997. He is a member of the Republican Party. The district includes most of Tuscaloosa County north of the Black Warrior River, as well as Birmingham's far northern suburbs in Walker County and the southern suburbs of Huntsville and Decatur.

A social conservative, Aderholt was a member of the Tea Party Caucus. He became the dean of Alabama's congressional delegation following Senator Richard Shelby's retirement at the end of the 117th Congress. According to the Cook Partisan Voting Index, Aderholt represents the most Republican district in the country, with an index rating of R+33.

Early life and education 
Aderholt was born in Haleyville, Alabama, to Mary Frances Brown and Bobby Ray Aderholt. Aderholt's father, a part-time minister for a small group of Congregational churches in northwest Alabama, was a circuit judge for more than 30 years. He attended the University of North Alabama and then Birmingham-Southern College, from which he graduated with a degree in history and political science. During college, Aderholt was a member of Kappa Alpha Order. Aderholt received his J.D. from the Samford University Cumberland School of Law and practiced law after graduation.

Career
In 1992, Aderholt was appointed Haleyville municipal judge. The same year, he was a delegate to the Republican National Convention. In 1995, he became the top aide to Governor Fob James. He won the 1996 Republican primary in the race to succeed 15-term Democratic incumbent Tom Bevill.

As the Republican nominee, Aderholt faced a considerable challenge against State Senator Bob Wilson Jr., who called himself a Democrat "in the Tom Bevill tradition". This was a seriously contested race, receiving considerable national coverage and significant support from the Republican Party. Newt Gingrich personally visited the district during the campaign. Aderholt won, 50%–48%, becoming only the second Republican to represent the district since Reconstruction. Two years later, he was reelected over Tom Bevil, Jr., his predecessor's son. The first Republican to win the seat had been Jim Martin, who was swept into office in what was then the 7th District during the 1964 wave that delivered the state's electoral votes to Barry Goldwater. After his first win, Aderholt has never faced another contest nearly that close, and has been reelected nine times. He ran unopposed in 2004, 2010, 2014, and 2016. His increasing margins reflected the growing Republican trend in this part of Alabama.

Aderholt is associated with the Fellowship Foundation, which paid for his trip to Romania in 2017 to promote "traditional family values". Over 16 years, Aderholt traveled to 18 countries on the Fellowship's behalf.

U.S. House of Representatives

Tenure
Aderholt is one of 147 Republican lawmakers who voted to overturn results in the 2020 presidential election. He was at the Capitol to confirm the election results when it was attacked. During the attack, he tweeted a prayer to God to "guide & protect this nation." In a video message, he later said that some of the attackers "crossed the line". Even after the attack, he supported overturning the election. Aderholt later opposed impeaching Trump for the second time.

In February 2021, Aderholt voted against the American Rescue Plan claiming that his opposition was due to half of the funding in the bill going to "unrelated liberal policies" and that the bill "has nothing to do with COVID-19 relief."

As of October 2021, Aderholt had voted in line with Joe Biden's stated position 7.5% of the time.

In January 2023, Aderholt announced that he had secured $13.8 million in funding for fourteen infrastructure projects in his district, including broadband expansion, roadways and access to medical care. Although announced during the 118th Congress, the funds were from the previous House session.

In February 2023, Aderholt was reported by CoinDesk as being one of three members of Alabama's congressional delegation who received money from FTX, the defunct cryptocurrency exchange, alongside Katie Britt and Gary Palmer. Aderholt's office did not respond to a CoinDesk inquiry regarding what had been done with the funds.

Committee assignments
 Committee on Appropriations
 Subcommittee on Agriculture, Rural Development, Food and Drug Administration, and Related Agencies
 Subcommittee on Commerce, Justice, Science, and Related Agencies (Ranking Member)
 Commission on Security and Cooperation in Europe

Caucuses
 Republican Study Committee
 Tea Party Caucus
 Congressional Caucus on Turkey and Turkish Americans
 Congressional NextGen 9-1-1 Caucus
United States Congressional International Conservation Caucus

Bills sponsored
Sponsor HR 3808: Interstate Recognition of Notarizations Act of 2010, 111th Congress

Representatives Bruce Braley, Mike Castle, and Artur Davis co-sponsored the bill.

H.R. 3808 Interstate Recognition of Notarizations Act of 2010 – To require any federal or state court to recognize any notarization made by a notary public licensed by a state other than the state where the court is located when such notarization occurs in or affects interstate commerce.

April 27, 2010: This bill passed the House of Representatives by voice vote. A record of each representative's position was not kept.

September 27, 2010: This bill passed the Senate by unanimous consent. A record of each senator's position was not kept.

October 8, 2010: vetoed by President.

H.R. 2017 Continuing Appropriations Act, 2012

May 26, 2011: Introduced

June 2, 2011: Passed House with amendments

September 26, 2011: Passed Senate with amendments

September 30, 2011: Became Public Law 112-33

Political positions
The American Conservative Union's center for legislative accountability gave Aderholt a 83% lifetime conservative rating and the progressive PAC Americans for Democratic Action gave him a 5% liberal quotient in 2019.

Abortion 

During the March for Life in Washington on January 22, 2010, Aderholt said, "The issue of abortion and the sanctity of life is something that I feel strongly about and I encourage my colleagues to look for ways to curb and stop abortions in the United States, while compassionately educating on this important issue." Aderholt supported the 2022 overturning of Roe v. Wade and called it a "watershed moment for life".

Budget and economy
Aderholt opposes reducing the defense budget to close the American deficit, and in May 2012 said "cuts to defense budgets – the federal government's primary Constitutional responsibility – shouldn't be the relief valve for uncontrolled domestic program spending".

Civil rights 

Aderholt opposes same-sex marriage. Aderholt condemned the Supreme Court decision in Obergefell v. Hodges, which held that same-sex marriage bans violated the US constitution. He has received high ratings from the Family Research Council, the Traditional Values Coalition, and the American Family Association. In 2013, the Human Rights Campaign gave him a score of 0 on its Congressional Scorecard.

Environment
During the 111th Congress, Aderholt voted for Steve Scalise's amendment to "require that Congress be allowed to vote on any executive regulation that would impose any tax, price, or levy upon carbon emissions... effectively prevents the executive branch from levying any form of carbon tax without Congressional approval. Since a carbon tax would be tremendously destructive to the economy as a whole, this measure would hopefully make such a tax unlikely to pass." Aderholt opposed regulations on greenhouse gas emissions, and in December 2008 helped write a letter to the U.S. Environmental Protection Agency that read, "I am opposed to any attempt to impose greenhouse gas regulations under the Clean Air Act on the agricultural industry."

Gun policy
Aderholt supports gun rights. He was endorsed by the National Rifle Association in the 2010 general election, and received $2,000 from it.

In the wake of the 2016 Orlando nightclub shooting, Aderholt called it a terrorist attack and said, "we do not have the luxury of debating the political correctness of 'radical Islam'", adding that there was a need to "hunt down those who would do us harm". He opposed the media and President Obama using the shooting to "push any type of political agenda relating to gun control" and called on the White House and Congress to "protect the homeland".

Health care

In 2019, Aderholt introduced a bill to raise the minimum age to purchase tobacco to 21.

Regulatory reform
In December 2011, Aderholt voted in support of H.R. 10, the Regulations from the Executive in Need of Scrutiny Act, which would have required congressional approval for any "major regulations" issued by the executive branch but, unlike the 1996 Congressional Review Act, would not require the president's signature or override of a probable presidential veto.

Tax policy
Aderholt is a signer of Americans for Tax Reform's Taxpayer Protection Pledge. He voted for the Tax Cuts and Jobs Act of 2017, saying it would "give back more money to Alabama taxpayers" and "does the right thing". He cited the raising of the child tax credit, changes to the state and local tax deductions, and said, "more than 80% the people in the 4th District of Alabama will receive a tax cut." Aderholt also said that more businesses will stay in the U.S. due to a lower corporate tax rate and therefore the act is a "jobs bill".

Texas v. Pennsylvania
In December 2020, Aderholt was one of 126 Republican members of the House of Representatives to sign an amicus brief in support of Texas v. Pennsylvania, a lawsuit filed at the United States Supreme Court contesting the results of the 2020 presidential election, in which Joe Biden defeated incumbent Donald Trump. The Supreme Court declined to hear the case on the basis that Texas lacked standing under Article III of the Constitution to challenge the results of an election held by another state.

Defense
In September 2021, Aderholt was among 75 House Republicans to vote against the National Defense Authorization Act of 2022, which contains a provision that would require women to be drafted.

Electoral history

Personal life 
Aderholt is married to Caroline McDonald. Her father, Albert, served in the Alabama State Senate and was Alabama Commissioner of Agriculture and Industries. They have two children.

On December 4, 2020, Aderholt announced that he had tested positive for COVID-19 after going into quarantine eight days earlier after his wife had tested positive.

Honors 
Aderholt has been awarded the following foreign honors:

 Commander of the Order of the Star of Romania, Romania (June 8, 2017)
 Serving Brother of the Most Venerable Order of the Hospital of St John of Jerusalem, United Kingdom (September 21, 2017)

Notes

Citations

References

External links 

 Congressman Robert B. Aderholt official U.S. House website
 Robert Aderholt official U.S House twitter
 
 
 

|-

1965 births
20th-century American politicians
21st-century American politicians
Alabama lawyers
Alabama state court judges
Birmingham–Southern College alumni
Living people
Municipal judges in the United States
People from Haleyville, Alabama
Commanders of the Order of the Star of Romania
Republican Party members of the United States House of Representatives from Alabama
Tea Party movement activists
University of North Alabama alumni